The FOW Hardcore Championship was a professional wrestling title in American independent promotion Future of Wrestling. The title was created when "Mr. Extreme" Pat McGuire won the title in Oakland Park, Florida on October 8, 1998. It was defended throughout southern Florida, most often in Oakland Park, Davie and Plantation, Florida. There have been a total of 9 recognized individual champions, who have had a combined 10 official reigns.

Title History

Combined reigns

References

External links
FOW Official Title History

Hardcore wrestling championships